Mohammad Rateb Al-Dawud (born 4 December 1992) is a Jordanian professional footballer who plays as a midfielder for Jordanian club Al-Salt.  
 
Al-Dawud is the son of Rateb Al-Dawud, who also played for Al-Ramtha and the Jordan national team.

International career
Al-Dawud's first match with the Jordan national senior team was against Libya in Doha on 17 December 2011 in the 2011 Pan Arab Games, which resulted in a 0-0 draw.

Career statistics

International

References
 Signs a Contract With Al-Ramtha SC 
 Mohammad Al-Dawud Signs Up for Hidd SCC of Bahrain for $150,000 
 Jordanian Mohammad Al-Dawud: "My Brilliance With Hidd SCC of Bahrain is My Gateway to Returning to the Jordan national football team"

External links 
 
 

1992 births
Living people
People from Irbid
Jordanian footballers
Jordan international footballers
Jordan youth international footballers
Association football midfielders
Al-Ramtha SC players
2015 AFC Asian Cup players
Expatriate footballers in Bahrain
Jordanian expatriate sportspeople in Bahrain
Jordanian expatriate footballers
Al-Salt SC players
Jordanian Pro League players
Bahraini Premier League players
Hidd SCC players